Nowgong is a city of Chhatarpur district of Madhya Pradesh. The town had a population of 11,507 in 1952. Vindhya Pradesh was merged into Madhya Pradesh on 1 November 1956. Nowgaon was declared capital of Madhya Pradesh, but after six months Bhopal became the capital of Madhya Pradesh.

Nowgong is well connected by roads and is on National Highway 39 about 110 km away from Jhansi.  The nearest railway station is Chhatarpur, 28–30 km  km away and the nearest airport is Khajuraho, 68 km away.  The town has an old British-era church.

The city was an important center during British rule when it was the headquarters of the Bundelkhand Agency. The town hosted a military cantonment with accommodation for all forces, the Kitchener College (for soldiers being trained to become officers), and had a school for the wards of the chiefs of Central India (1872–1898), in addition to being the headquarters of the Political Assistant of the Agency.

History of Nowgong 
Cantonment of Nowgong was established in 1842–43 when Kaitha in the Hamirpur was given up to British ruler. On the sight of 4 villages named Nayagaon, Bilerhi, Dudri & Pipri and is named after the first village in 1869. More land was acquired from the Chattarpur State and Cantonment was enlarged. In 1859 Nowgong was made first headquarters of the Bundelkhand Political Agency. The earlier records of this agency were destroyed in the mutiny of 1857 later on post acquiring the area, British has started establishing the place by setting up markets and also colonized the place. These also made State houses for representatives of different states of Bundelkhand.

Climate

Education and training 
 Nowgong Polytechnic College formerly known as Govt. Polytechnic College Nowgong (1st Polytechnic in Bundelkhand) was established on 2 October 1952. The College campus is spread over an area of 14 hectares.
 Kitchener College (closed) 1929-1964. Became Army Cadet College in 1960 and relocated to Pune in 1964. It used to run a 2 year preparatory course for the India army and graduates went on to the Indian Military Academy, Dehradun (IMA), the officer training school.
 The King George's School Nowgong 1952–1960 (in the buildings of the  Kitchener college). Relocated to Chail as the Chail Military School in 1960.
 District Institute of Education and Training
 Nowgong Polytechnic College, formerly known as Govt. Polytechnic College Nowgong (was established on 2 October 1952)
 Government Degree College.
 Government Engineering College (2012) - It is a government Autonomous College situated at Newra Pahadi. 1st batch was admitted in 2013. 
 Jawahar Lal Nehru Navodaya Vidyalaya
 Government fisheries research and training institute
 Gov. T.B. Hospital
 Gov. Sale Tax Office Nowgong
 Government Nagar Palika Office
 Government P.W.D. office
 Division water resources office
 Malaria office Nowgong (Chhatarpur and Tikamgarh District)
 S.D.O.P. office city Kotwali Nowgong

Private schools
 Takshashila Public Model School (Affiliated to C.B.S.E.)  Nagar Palika Chauraha
 DPS Junior World play School, Near Siddeswar Dhaam Mandir Garroli Road
 Angel Public School (English medium) in front of Club or also known as Panna house
 Lead India Public School
 GCM Convent Senior Secondary School (CBSE-English Medium) near Mahoba road 
 R. S. Memorial Public School (English Medium) near Ramleela ground
 Sunrise International School (English  Medium ) near Pipri road
 Acharya Shriram Vidhyalaya (CBSE English Medium) near Badi devi mata
 Bala ji aadarsh vidhyalaya (Hindi–English Medium)
 R.S. modern english school (C.B.S.E.) near before Tidni tiraha Chhatarpur road
 S.B. palibal english school (C.B.S.E.) near before Tidni tiraha Chhatarpur road
 Nalanda public school near Sabji mandi
 Kidzee play school in front of Allahabad bank
 Maharishi vidhya mandir school near Church

Government colleges 
 Engineering College, Nowgong
 Polytechnic College.                                                                                                                                                                                                                                                     * GOVERNMENT CENTRAL SCHOOL NOWGONG (PROJECTED)
 Government Degree College
 State Bank of India Rural Self Employment Training Institute (SBI-RSETI) BKD.
 Government Krishi Vigyan Kendra
 Government Pan Anusandhan Kendra
 Government Mitti parikshan Kendra
 Government fisheries research and training institute (only one all in M.P.)
 Government Prashikshan kendra Nowgong (Bilehri road)
 Government Bank Prashikshan Kendra Nowgong (Garroli road) (3 all in M.P.)
 District Institute of Education and Training
 Government Panchayat training Kendra (Pipari road)

Private colleges
 Sunrise college
 Balaji college
 R.S. college
 Career college
 Shri Ram college
 Shri Ganesh private I.T.I. college Nowgong near Ishanagar chouraha
 Ramraja private I.T.I. college Nowgong near Tidni tiraha Chhatarpur road
 Navyug private I.T.I. college Nowgong near B.T.I. college
 BHAGINI NIVEDITA SHIKHA SAMITI
(Skill Development Institute)

By Nagar Palika Parishad Nowgong

Director- Mr. Mohsin Khan

References

Cities and towns in Chhatarpur district